The Leza River Bridge (Spanish: Puente Romano sobre el río Leza) is the ruins of a bridge located in Agoncillo, Spain. It was declared Bien de Interés Cultural in 1981.

References 

Bien de Interés Cultural landmarks in La Rioja (Spain)
Bridges in La Rioja (Spain)
Ruins in Spain
Ruined bridges